Purge is the fourth album by Canadian singer-songwriter Bif Naked, released in 2001. In 2002, the song "Dawn" was featured in the film American Psycho 2. The songs "Regular Guy" and "Tango Shoes" were featured in Project Gotham Racing 2. Meanwhile "Leader" also appeared in SSX Tricky, in which Bif Naked appeared as a Character voice of Zoe Payne.

In 2021 "I Love Myself Today" was used as a lip sync number in a second season episode of Canada's Drag Race, in which Bif Naked appeared as a guest judge.

Track listing
 "Choking on the Truth" (Fury, Karroll, Naked) – 3:38
 "Tango Shoes" (Fury, Karroll, Naked) – 3:47
 "Dawn" (Karroll, Naked) – 3:34
 "I Love Myself Today" (Bazilian, Child, Naked) – 3:30
 "Stolen Sidewalk" (Karroll, Naked) – 4:33
 "October Song" (Fury, Karroll, Naked) – 3:27
 "Leader" (Fury, Naked) – 3:33
 "You Are the Master" (Karroll, Naked) – 4:00
 "Regular Guy" (Karroll, Naked) – 3:17
 "Hold On" (Karroll, Naked) – 3:26
 "Story of My Life" (Fury, Naked) – 3:40
 "Religion" (Karroll, Naked) – 12:54†
 "Untitled" (None) – 00:04‡

†Hidden Track "I Love Myself Today [Misera Remix]" (Bazilian, Child, Naked, Misera) – 6:28

‡Some pressings contain a thirteenth track that is nothing but 4 seconds of silence.

Personnel
Bif Naked – vocals, background vocals
Pete Amato – keyboards
Randy Cantor – Hammond organ
Desmond Child – background vocals
Jules Gondar – background vocals
Peter Karroll – bass guitar, guitar
Kenny Olson – guitar
Thommy Price – drums, background vocals
Kasim Sulton – bass, background vocals

Production
Producers: Desmond Child, Peter Karroll
Engineers: Rob Eaton, Jules Gondar, Craig Lozowick, Nathan Malki, Germán Ortiz
Mixing: Peter Karroll
Mastering: Andy VanDette

Charts

Year-end charts

Certifications

References

Bif Naked albums
2001 albums
Albums produced by Desmond Child